Achille is a masculine given name and occasionally a surname.

Achille may also refer to:

 , four ships of the Royal Navy
 French ship Achille, ten ships of the French Navy
 Achille, Oklahoma, United States, a town
 Philip Achille, 21st century UK harmonica player
 Achille (opera), an 1801 opera by Ferdinando Paer

See also
 Achilles (disambiguation)